Brandenburg Gate: Revisited is a studio album by The Dave Brubeck Quartet accompanied by an orchestra arranged by Howard Brubeck.

The album peaked at 137 on the Billboard 200.

Reception

Billboard magazine featured the album as a "Billboard Spotlight Pick" in their November 23, 1963 issue.

The album was reviewed by Lindsay Planer at Allmusic who wrote with regards the orchestral accompaniment that "...The subtle tension and liberation that exists between the two arguably disparate aggregates prevent either from overpowering the other. Likewise, spirited leads and improvisations from Brubeck and Desmond keep the elaborate piece agile and firmly rooted in jazz." Planer wrote that Desmond on "Summer Song" "...once again reels off impressive lines that never detract from the tastefully understated string augmentation" and of the "G Flat Theme" that "...What begins as dark and melancholy dissipates into a mid-tempo groove that drives both Brubeck and Desmond into some very interesting spaces as they quickly adapt their sound to the slightly noir, but highly memorable chorus."

Track listing
 All music composed by Dave Brubeck except otherwise noted

 "Brandenburg Gate" - 18:31
 "Summer Song" - 4:14
 "In Your Own Sweet Way" - 5:01
 "G Flat Theme" (Howard Brubeck) - 3:58
 "Kathy's Waltz" - 3:02

Personnel
 Dave Brubeck - piano
 Paul Desmond - alto saxophone
 Gene Wright - double bass
 Joe Morello - drums
 Unidentified orchestra
 Howard Brubeck - arranger
 Teo Macero - producer

References

1964 live albums
Albums produced by Teo Macero
Columbia Records live albums
Dave Brubeck live albums